Zartuji (also Romanized as Zartūjī; also known as Zartūchī) is a village in Karian Rural District, in the Central District of Minab County, Hormozgan Province, Iran. At the 2006 census, its population was 1,423, in 292 families.

References 

Populated places in Minab County